Big Freedia Bounces Back (formerly Big Freedia: Queen of Bounce) is an American reality television series that airs on the Fuse and premiered on October 2, 2013.

Premise
This show follows Big Freedia on her journey toward superstardom in the mainstream media. As the undisputed ambassador of the energetic, New Orleans-based Bounce movement, Big Freedia is never afraid to twerk, wiggle, and shake her way to self-confidence, and is encouraging her fans to do the same.

Reception
During publicity for the show, Freedia led a crowd of hundreds in New York City to set the Guinness World Record for twerking. The second season of the show aired in 2014 and followed her mother Vera Ross's battle with cancer, which she lost on April 1, 2014, while Freedia was away doing a show. Freedia immediately flew back to New Orleans and planned a jazz funeral through the streets of the city, which the show aired.

Series overview

Episodes

Season 1 (2013)

Season 2 (2014)

Season 3 (2015)

Season 4 (2015)

Season 5 (2016)

Season 6 (2017)

References

External links
 Big Freedia on Fuse

2013 American television series debuts
2010s American reality television series
Hip hop television
African-American reality television series
Television shows set in New Orleans
English-language television shows
GLAAD Media Award-winning shows
2017 American television series endings
American LGBT-related reality television series
2010s American LGBT-related television series